Magura-1 is a constituency represented in the Jatiya Sangsad (National Parliament) of Bangladesh since 2019 by Saifuzzaman Shikhor of the Awami League.

Boundaries 
The constituency encompasses Sreepur Upazila, Magura Municipality, and nine union parishads of Magura Sadar Upazila: Atharakhada, Bagia, Chaulia, Hazrapur, Jagdal, Kasundi, Maghi, and Raghab Dair.

History 
The constituency was created in 1984 from the Jessore-12 constituency when the former Jessore District was split into four districts: Jhenaidah, Jessore, Magura, and Narail.

Members of Parliament

Elections

Elections in the 2010s 
Muhammad Serajul Akbar died in March 2015. ATM Abdul Wahab of the Awami League was elected in a May 2015 by-election.

Elections in the 2000s

Elections in the 1990s

References

External links
 

Parliamentary constituencies in Bangladesh
Magura District